James Morhard (born 20 September 1956) is a former American government official who served as the Deputy Administrator of NASA under President Donald Trump.

Biography

Early life and education
Morhard was born in Washington, DC. He received his Bachelor of Science in Accounting from Saint Francis University, his Master's in Business Administration from George Washington University, and his J.D. from Georgetown University.

Career
Morhard began his career in the Secretary of the Navy’s Office of the Comptroller. Morhard later served as Staff Director of the Committee on Appropriations, where he also managed the Subcommittee on Commerce, Justice, State, and the Judiciary, as it was called during the 108th Congress (2003–05), now known as the Subcommittee on Commerce, Justice, Science, and Related Agencies. He also oversaw the Appropriations Subcommittee on Military Construction, as it was called up to the 108th Congress, now the Subcommittee on Military Construction, Veterans Affairs, and Related Agencies. This subcommittee was responsible for funding all construction activities within the Department of Defense. 

Morhard served as Deputy Sergeant at Arms for the United States Senate from January 2015 to October 2018.

Morhard was nominated by then President Donald Trump on July 12, 2018 to serve as Deputy Administrator for NASA and was confirmed on October 11, 2018 in a voice vote. At the time of his nomination, Morhard was noted for his lack of experience in space technology, but his strong bipartisan connections on Capitol Hill and Appropriations Committee experience were noted as potential benefits for the Agency. James Morhard resigned from NASA after Donald Trump left office on January 20, 2021.

He is a survivor of the 2010 Alaska DHC-3 Otter crash that killed five others onboard, including former U.S. Senator Ted Stevens of Alaska.

References

External links
NASA biography

Living people
Survivors of aviation accidents or incidents
Trump administration personnel
Deputy Administrators of NASA
Saint Francis University alumni
George Washington University School of Business alumni
Georgetown University Law Center alumni
Employees of the United States Senate
1956 births